Christopher David Renzema (REN-ze-ma) is a singer/songwriter and performer based out of Nashville, Tennessee. Chris grew up in Grand Rapids, Michigan, where he learned to play guitar, write songs, and performed at local churches. Renzema blends aspects of Indie Rock, Contemporary Christian, and Folk amongst other musical influences.

His self-produced albums have been played in churches across the country and made a strong impact on digital listeners. His early work included Age To Age - EP, 2014 (as Chris Renzema & Moriah Hazeltine) and a single, Son Of God - Single. His debut album, I'll Be The Branches, was released independently in 2018. In December 2018, Renzema announced he'd be signing with Centricity Music. Since then he has put out two more albums, one in 2020, Let the Ground Rest, and another in 2021 entitled, Get Out of the Way of Your Own Heart.

Discography

Singles 

 Son of God (2017)
 Jacob/HTBY (2019)
 Caught In The Reeds (Moses) (2021)
 Mary & Joseph (2022)

Extended plays 

 Age to Age (2014)
 Let The Ground Rest B-Sides (2021)
 HOPE OR NOSTALGIA LIVE (2021)

Albums 

 I'll Be The Branches (2018)
 Let the Ground Rest (2020)
 Get Out of the Way of Your Own Heart (2021)

Awards

GMA Dove Awards

References

Year of birth missing (living people)
Living people
American male singer-songwriters
American singer-songwriters